The Tioga River is a  tributary of the Sturgeon River in Baraga County, Michigan, United States.

See also
List of rivers of Michigan

References

Michigan  Streamflow Data from the USGS

Rivers of Michigan
Rivers of Baraga County, Michigan
Tributaries of Lake Superior